Ringwood North is a suburb of Melbourne, Victoria, Australia, 24 km east of Melbourne's Central Business District, located within the Cities of Manningham and Maroondah local government areas. Ringwood North recorded a population of 9,964 at the 2021 census.

The suburb is mostly located within the City of Maroondah, with a small part in the north west of the suburb being located within the City of Manningham.

It is bounded on the south by Loughnan, Warrandyte and Wonga Roads (these roads flow into one another continuously). Glenvale Road forms the westernmost boundary in the southern part of the suburb, with the Warrandyte-Ringwood Road forming the western boundary at the northern end of the suburb. The eastern and northern boundaries follow property lines, rather than roads.

Ringwood North Post Office opened on 9 August 1920, in the then rural area.

Ringwood North has its own shopping centre and also has plenty of parklands and reserves nearby without being excessively rural, like Wonga Park or Warrandyte. Its roads feature a happy medium between the sterile, parallel streetscapes of Ringwood and the circular, 'contour-line' style streets found in neighbouring Park Orchards.

Ringwood North is a surprisingly hilly area, which is especially evident around the aptly named Loughnan's Hill area and the infamously steep Glenvale Road. Glenvale Road also happens to mark the boundary between Ringwood North and Donvale and also the boundary between Maroondah and Manningham. Glenvale Road is also home to an 80-year-old Tudor house of famous heritage.

Education

Primary schools 
 Ringwood Heights Primary School
 Ringwood North Primary School
 Holy Spirit Community School

Secondary schools 
There are no secondary schools within the suburb of Ringwood North however Norwood Secondary College lies just over the boundary with the neighbouring suburb of Ringwood.

Sport

The suburb has an Australian rules football team, the North Ringwood Saints, who compete in the Eastern Football League.

The suburb also has a cricket club, the North Ringwood Bulls, which takes part in the Ringwood and District Cricket Association.

Notable people
Dean Bailey - Australian rules footballer and coach
Peter Banfield - Australian rules footballer
Gary O'Donnell - Australian rules footballer
Shelley O'Donnell - netballer
Paul Salmon - Australian rules footballer

See also
 City of Doncaster and Templestowe – Parts of Ringwood North were previously within this former local government area.
 City of Ringwood – Parts of Ringwood North were previously within this former local government area.

References

External links
North Ringwood FC official homepage

Suburbs of Melbourne
Suburbs of the City of Maroondah
Suburbs of the City of Manningham
Ringwood, Victoria